Syzygium boonjee, known as the Boonjee satinash, is a rainforest plant of tropical Queensland, Australia. Found between Gordonvale and Tully. Usually a shrub, it may reach 8 metres tall.

References

boonjee
Myrtales of Australia
Flora of Queensland
Trees of Australia
Taxa named by Bernard Hyland